Oryun-dong is a neighbourhood, dong of Songpa-gu, Seoul, South Korea.

Education
Schools located in Oryun-dong:
 Seoul Oryun Elementary School
 Seoul Seryun Elementary School
 Boseong Middle School
 Seoul Physical Education Middle School
 Oryun Middle School
 Boseong High School
 Seoul Physical Education High School
 Korea National Sport University

Transportation 
 Olympic Park station of 
 Mongchontoseong station of

See also
Administrative divisions of South Korea
1988 Summer Olympics

References

External links
 Oryun-dong resident center website
 Songpa-gu tourist map

Neighbourhoods of Songpa District